Dots or The Dots may refer to:

Dots (candy), produced by Tootsie Roll Industries
Dots (game), a pencil-and-paper game
Dots (video game), a 2013 mobile game produced by Betaworks
Dots (film), a 1940 short animated film by Norman McLaren
 The Dots (TV series), a 2003-2004 Iranian sitcom
"Dots" or "Dot Dot Dot", Singlish slangs denoting speechlessness, from Japanese manga
Paul Kelly and the Dots (1978–1982), an Australian rock band fronted by Paul Kelly
The Dots, a New York City pop punk band fronted by Jimi Quidd
Dots Miller (1886-1923), American Major League Baseball player

DOTS may be an acronym for:
Directly observed treatment, short-course, a tuberculosis control strategy recommended by the World Health Organization
Damage over time, a term used in some popular MMORPG games
Descendants of the Sun, a 2016 South Korean television series
Descendants of the Sun (Philippine TV series), a 2020 Philippine television series based on the South Korean series
Difference of two squares, a mathematical term

See also
Dot-S, a toy released in Japan
Dot (disambiguation)
Ellipsis, a punctuation mark in a form of a series of dots